Edward Snyder may refer to:
Ted Snyder (1881–1965), American composer and lyricist
Edward Snyder (cinematographer) (1895–1982), American cinematographer
Eddie Snyder (1919–2011), American composer and songwriter
J. Edward Snyder (1924–2007), U.S. navy officer
Ed Snider (1933–2016), American chairman of Comcast Spectacor
Ted Snyder (economist) (born 1953), American economist